Dendromyza is a genus of flowering plants belonging to the family Santalaceae. They are dioecious stem-parasitic shrubs.

Its native range is Malesia to Solomon Islands.

Species:

Dendromyza acrosclera 
Dendromyza acutata 
Dendromyza angustifolia 
Dendromyza crassifolia 
Dendromyza cucullata 
Dendromyza cuneata 
Dendromyza dendromyzoides 
Dendromyza densa 
Dendromyza dubia 
Dendromyza erecta 
Dendromyza gracilis 
Dendromyza hiepkoana 
Dendromyza intricata 
Dendromyza kaniensis 
Dendromyza laevis 
Dendromyza latifolia 
Dendromyza ledermannii 
Dendromyza microphylla 
Dendromyza multinervis 
Dendromyza nivalis 
Dendromyza pachydisca 
Dendromyza puberula 
Dendromyza reinwardtiana 
Dendromyza robustior 
Dendromyza salomonia 
Dendromyza staufferi 
Dendromyza stellata 
Dendromyza trinervia 
Dendromyza uncinata 
Dendromyza volubilis

References

Santalaceae
Santalales genera
Dioecious plants